Abkot (also Romanized as Ābkot and Āb-i-Kūt; also known as Āb Kot-e Pā’īn, Āb Kot-e Soflá, Ābkowt-e Pā’īn, and Ābkūt-e Soflá) is a village in Razan Rural District, Zagheh District, Khorramabad County, Lorestan Province, Iran. At the 2006 census, its population was 72, in 14 families.

References 

Towns and villages in Khorramabad County